Parathodu  is a village under Kanjirappally Taluk in Kottayam district in the India in state of Kerala.

Demographics
Parathodu is located between Kanjirappally and Mundakkayam in the KK (Kottayam-Kumaly) Road.

References

Villages in Kottayam district